Kang Min-hyuk (born June 28, 1991) is a South Korean musician, singer-songwriter, and actor. He is the drummer of South Korean rock band CNBLUE.

Career

2009–present: CNBLUE

Kang became a member of CNBLUE in 2009. The group debuted in Japan with the mini album Now or Never on August 19, 2009, with an indie label AI Entertainment. They officially debuted in Korea in 2010 with the mini album Bluetory, and the title track "I'm a Loner" became an instant hit in Korea.

2010–present: Acting roles and solo activities
In 2010, Kang began his acting career in an omnibus film Acoustic alongside his fellow CNBLUE member Lee Jong-hyun. He then made his small-screen debut in the SBS drama It's Okay, Daddy's Girl.

In 2011, he was cast in MBC's youth melodrama Heartstrings, which stars fellow CNBLUE member Jung Yong-hwa. He sang an OST for the drama, titled "Star".

In 2012, he starred in KBS's weekend family drama My Husband Got a Family, and gained recognition for his role as a playboy. The series topped the weekly ratings chart for 25 consecutive weeks and reached a ratings peak of 45.8 percent (TNmS) and 52.3 percent (AGB Nielsen), making it the highest rated Korean drama in 2012.

Kang continued to gain more popularity after starring in The Heirs (2013), a teen drama penned by Kim Eun-sook. Along with his co-star Krystal Jung, they were voted as the Best Onscreen Couple at the 2013 DramaFever Awards.

In 2015, Kang became a fixed cast of KBS's reality-variety show Brave Family, and became a host of JTBC's show Mum is Watching.

After a three-year hiatus, Kang made his television comeback in SBS's musical drama Entertainer in 2016, for which he won an Excellence Award at the SBS Drama Awards. The same year, he became a host of KBS's live music show Music Bank with Laboum's Solbin from July 2016 to November 2016.

In 2017, Kang was cast in his first lead role, playing a doctor in MBC's medical drama Hospital Ship.

In 2018, Kang had a supporting role in the period comedy film, The Princess and the Matchmaker. The film was shot back in 2015.

In 2019, Kang released two Japanese singles, Moontalk and On the Cheek, on January 7 and February 14, respectively. He dropped the album containing these two singles along with three more Japanese tracks on March 13.

Following his discharge from the military in early 2020, Kang made his acting comeback in a romantic comedy-drama, How to Be Thirty. The streaming television series premiered on KakaoTV in February 2021.

In March 2021, Kang starred in MBC's romantic comedy series, Oh My Ladylord.

In October 2021, Kang announced his own YouTube channel, 만취민혁 Hobby Binger.

On March 25, 2022, Kang made his debut as a writer in the MD book Not Everything, and an exhibition of books will be held together. This MD includes mugs, mugs, coasters, blankets, and punctuation stickers.

In September 2022, it was announced that Kang will be holding the 2022 KANG MIN HYUK FROM CNBLUE 'THE PASSION' FAN MEETING IN BANGKOK fan meeting on October 9. However, it has been postponed. in October  2022, It was announced that Kang will be holding the 2022 KANG MIN HYUK FROM CNBLUE FAN MEETING IN TAIPEI fan meeting in Taipei, Taiwan on December 4.

Personal life

Mandatory military service
Kang enlisted in his military service on July 31, 2018.

During his service he served in the 55th Division Yongin, Gyeonggi Province.

Kang has been discharged as of March 19, 2020 without returning to his base from his ETS leave according to the Ministry of National Defense's policy.

Philanthropy
On April 6, 2019, it was reported that Kang donated 10 million won to the victims of forest fires in Goseong County and Sokcho in Gangwon Province. According to Hope Bridge National Disaster Relief Association, the donation will be used for the recovery of damaged areas.

Filmography

Film

Television series

Web series

Television shows

Hosting

Discography

Singles

Awards and nominations

References

External links
 
 
MinHyuk's Youtube Channel - Hobby Binger Minhyuk

1991 births
Living people
People from Goyang
FNC Entertainment artists
South Korean singer-songwriters
South Korean male film actors
South Korean male television actors
South Korean male singers
South Korean pop rock singers
CNBLUE members
South Korean male idols
South Korean television presenters
South Korean percussionists
South Korean male singer-songwriters
South Korean male web series actors